Jacob Wilhelm Frohne(15 August 1832   13 July 1909), isially referred to as J. W- Frohne. was a Danish master mason, architect and art collector. A book about 18th-century Danish faience manufacturers by him was published posthumously in 1910. His two villas at Vodroffsvej 8 and Vodroffsvej 10 were individually listed in the Danish registry of protected buildings and places in 1980.

Early life and education
Frohne was born in Flensburg, the son of master butcher Johan Christian Frohne (1806–86) and Marie Jürgensen (1808-89). He attended Flensburg Latin School and was a mason's apprentice from 1949- In 1852, he moved to Copenhagen. In 1853-54, he went abroad as a journeyman.

Career
Back in Copenhagen, he spent some time working as an executing architect for Niels Sigfred Nebelong before in 1850 setting up his own business as a master mason in Copenhagen. He worked on the construction of Johanne Louise Heiberg's villa in the Tosenvænget neighborhood,  Hvidøre and Springforbi north of Copenhage, Aalborg Cathedral School in {{Aalborg]] tand, History|College of Advanced Technologies and Marstrand's Brewery in Copenhagen.

He was also charged with the construction of three villas at Vodrofvej by Niels Wolff in Frederiksberg.

Personal life and legacy

Frphne remained unmarried. He was a prolific art collector, especially of faience and porcelain by Danish manufacturers- He died on 13 July 1909 and is buried in Copenhagen's Western Cemetery. Ge bequeethed a substantial part of his collection to the Danish Museum of Arts and Crafts. The rest of the collection was sold at auction at Charlottenburg after his death. The catalogue was created by Emil Hannover. It attraced many international art dealers from a wide range of countries.

Frohne is today above all remembered for his study of 18th century Danish faience. A shortened version of his writings on the matter was published posthumously by C. A. Been in 1911 asDanske Fajancer. Historiske Meddelelser om Fajancefabrikker i Danmark og Hertugdømmerne i det 18. Aarhundrede (1911). The original manuscript, entitled 'Murermester Frohnes Fremstilling af Fajancernes og Stentøjets Historie, is in the collection of the Royal Danish Library (Ny Kgl. saml. nr. 2789 4°).

One of his three Codrofvejvillas has later been demolished. The two surviving villas at Vodroffsvej 8 and Vodroffsvej 10 were individually listed in the Danish registry of protected buildings and places in 1980.<ref name="Kulturstyrelsen">

Awards
Frohne was created a Knight in the Order of the Dannebrog in 1890. In 1909, he was awarded the Cross of Gonour.

References

External links

 Source

Danish craftsmen
19th-century Danish architects
Danish bricklayers
Danish art collectors
Knights of the Order of the Dannebrog
Recipients of the Cross of Honour of the Order of the Dannebrog
Burials at Vestre Cemetery, Copenhagen

da:J.W. Frohne